Portrait of My Wife, the Painter Anna Archer is an 1884 painting by Michael Ancher, now in the Hirschsprung Collection.

She is shown looking through an open door, with a wedding ring on her right hand and her husband's dog looking at Anna's pregnancy bump - the study for the work was painted in summer 1883 and she gave birth to their daughter Helga that August. One of P.S. Krøyer's first pastel drawings of painters at work (which became a major feature of his oeuvre) was Michael Ancher Painting the Portrait of Anna, Standing at the Door, showing Ancher producing the final version of Portrait. It was exhibited in Copenhagen in 1884, with the depiction of pregnancy causing some controversy, though the theme of the artist's wife soon became popular among other Danish painters.

References 

Ancher, Anna
Ancher, Anna
Paintings by Michael Ancher
Cultural depictions of Anna Ancher
1884 paintings
Paintings in the Hirschsprung Collection